Jupiter LII, originally known as , is a natural satellite of Jupiter. It was discovered by Christian Veillet in 2010. It received its permanent number in March 2015. It takes 1.69 years to orbit around Jupiter, and its average distance is 21.01 million km. Jupiter LII has a diameter of about 1 kilometer and in 2010 it was labeled the smallest known moon in the Solar System to have been discovered from Earth. It is a member of the Ananke group.

See also
 S/2009 S 1, 400 m 'propeller moonlet' of Saturn, discovered by the Cassini orbiter

References

Ananke group
Moons of Jupiter
Irregular satellites
Discoveries by Christian Veillet
20100908
Moons with a retrograde orbit